16 Year Olds or Le sedicenni is a 1965 Italian film directed by Luigi Petrini.

Cast
Laura Antonelli
Franca Badeschi
Lilly Bistrattin
Anna Maria Checchi
Dino
Carlo Giuffrè
Rosalba Grottesi
Lorenza Guerrieri
Alberto Mandolesi
Marina Marfoglia
Bice Valori
 Ely Drago

External links

1965 films
Italian romance films
1960s Italian-language films
1960s Italian films